A dopamine antagonist, also known as an anti-dopaminergic and a dopamine receptor antagonist (DRA), is a type of drug which blocks dopamine receptors by receptor antagonism. Most antipsychotics are dopamine antagonists, and as such they have found use in treating schizophrenia, bipolar disorder, and stimulant psychosis. Several other dopamine antagonists are antiemetics used in the treatment of nausea and vomiting.

Receptor pharmacology

Dopamine receptors are all G protein–coupled receptors, and are divided into two classes based on which G-protein they are coupled to. The D1-like class of dopamine receptors is coupled to Gαs/olf and stimulates adenylate cyclase production, whereas the D2-like class is coupled to Gαi/o and thus inhibits adenylate cyclase production.

D1-like receptors: D1 and D5
D1-like receptors – D1 and D5 are always found post-synaptically. The genes coding these receptors lack introns, so there are no splice variants.

D1 receptors
 D1 receptors are found mainly on neurons in the nucleus accumbens as well as substantia nigra, striatum, amygdala, frontal cortex and olfactory bulb and retina
 Also found (in lower levels) in the hypothalamus, thalamus, cerebellum and hippocampus
 Peripherally, these receptors have been found in the renal artery, mesenteric artery, and splenic artery where activation leads to vasodilation. In addition, D1 receptors have been found in the kidney

D5 receptors
 Low levels of D5 receptors have been found in the hypothalamus, prefrontal cortex and cingulate cortex; as well as memory areas such as hippocampus, dentate gyrus and entorhinal cortex.
 In addition, D5 receptors have been found in the kidney

D2-like receptors: D2, D3 and D4
D2-like receptors unlike the D1-like class, these receptors are found pre and post-synaptically. The genes that code these receptors have introns, leading to many alternately spliced variants.

D2 receptors
 D2 receptors are found in the striatum, substantia nigra, ventral tegmental area, hypothalamus, cortex, septum, amygdala, hippocampus, and olfactory tubercle.
 These receptors have also been found in the retina and pituitary gland.
 Peripherally, these receptors have been found in the renal, mesenteric, and splenic arteries as well as on the adrenal cortex and medulla and within the kidney.

D3 receptors
 D3 receptors are highly expressed on neurons in islands of Calleja and nucleus accumbens shell and lowly expressed in areas such as the substantia nigra pars compacta, hippocampus, septal area, and ventral tegmental area.
 Additional studies have found these receptors peripherally in the kidney

D4 receptors
 D4 receptors are found in amygdala, hippocampus, hypothalamus, globus pallidus, substantia nigra pars reticula, the thalamus, the retina and the kidney

Implications in disease
The dopaminergic system has been implicated in a variety of disorders. Parkinson's disease results from loss of dopaminergic neurons in the striatum. Furthermore, most effective antipsychotics block D2 receptors, suggesting a role for dopamine in schizophrenia. Additional studies hypothesize dopamine dysregulation is involved in Huntington's disease, ADHD, Tourette's syndrome, major depression, manic depression, addiction, hypertension and kidney dysfunction. Dopamine receptor antagonists are used for some diseases such as schizophrenia, bipolar disorder, nausea and vomiting.

 Melatonin suppresses dopamine activity as part of normal circadian rhythm functions, although pathological imbalances have been implicated in Parkinson's disease

Side effects
They may include one or more of the following and last indefinitely even after cessation of the dopamine antagonist, especially after long-term or high-dosage use:

 Cardiovascular disease
 Extrapyramidal symptoms (EPS) associated with typical antipsychotics:
 Early stage – occurs at onset of treatment or following increased dose, patients recover when dose is decreased
 Acute dystonias – muscle spasms and sustained abnormal postures and onset occurs within a few days; can be treated with anticholinergics
 risk factors include age, gender and family history
 Akathisia - pacing and restlessness and onset occurs within the first few months; can be treated with beta blockers and benzodiazepines
 Parkinsonism due to effects on the nigrostriatal pathway - includes tremors, bradykinesia and muscle rigidity
 risk factors include age and gender
 Late stage – occurs after prolonged (months-years) treatment, symptoms persist even after dose is decreased
 Tardive dyskinesia - includes involuntary and repetitive facial movements
 risk factors include age, race and gender
 It is hypothesized that these effects are due to chronic blockade of the D2 receptor
 Hyperprolactinaemia due to blockade of the D2 receptors in the anterior pituitary leading to increased prolactin release
 Increased appetite including increased craving and binge eating that lead to weight gain
 Increased risk for insulin resistance
 Sexual dysfunction
 Metabolic changes with increased risk of obesity and diabetes mellitus type 2
 Sedation
Neuroleptic Malignant Syndrome is a medical emergency caused by a decrease in dopaminergic activity, resulting in a central D2 receptor blockade.

Examples

First-generation antipsychotics (typical)
First generation antipsychotics are used to treat schizophrenia and are often accompanied by extrapyramidal side effects. They inhibit dopaminergic neurotransmission in the brain by blocking about 72% of the D2 dopamine receptors. They can also block noradrenergic, cholinergic, and histaminergic activity.

 Benperidol binds D2 and some serotonin receptors. It is absorbed very easily and has a high first pass effect.
 Chlorpromazine binds D3 with the highest affinity, but also binds D1, D2, D4 and D5

 Clopenthixol
 Droperidol is used as an antipsychotic and antiemetic.
 Haloperidol binds D2, D3 and D4 with the highest affinity, but also binds D1 and D5. Haloperidol also has a risk for QTc prolongation. 
 Fluphenazine binds D2 and D3 with the highest affinity but D1 and D5 as well
 Flupentixol binds D1, D2, D3, and D5 and is also used as an antidepressant.
 Fluspirilene
 Penfluridol
 Perazine

 Perphenazine
 Pimozide binds D2 and D3 with high affinity, also binds D4 receptors

 Spiperone binds D2, D3 and D4 with high affinity; can also bind D1

 Sulpiride binds D2 and D3 and is also used as an antidepressant.
 Thioridazine binds D2, D3 and D4 with high affinity; can also bind D1 and D5 at higher concentrations Thioridazine has the highest associated risk of QTc prolongation among neuroleptics.

Second-generation antipsychotics (atypical)
These drugs are not only dopamine antagonists at the receptor specified, but also act on serotonin receptor 5HT2A. (Citation inappropriate) These drugs have less extrapyramidal side effects and are less likely to affect prolactin levels when compared to typical antipsychotics.

 Amisulpride binds D2 and D3 and is used as an antipsychotic, antidepressant and also treats bipolar disorder. It treats both the positive and negative symptoms of schizophrenia.
 Asenapine binds D2, D3 and D4 and is used to treat bipolar disorder and schizophrenia. Its side effects include weight gain but there is lower risk for orthostatic hypotension, hyperprolactinemia
 Aripiprazole binds D2 as a partial agonist but antagonizes D3. In addition, aripiprazole treats schizophrenia, bipolar disorder (mania), depression, and tic disorders

 Clozapine binds D1 and D4 with the highest affinity but still binds D2 and D3. Clozapine is unique because it is only prescribed when treatment with at least two other antipsychotics has failed due to its very harsh side effects. It also requires weekly white blood cell counts to monitor potential neutropenia.

 Loxapine binds D2, D3 and D4 with high affinity; can also bind D1. Loxapine is often used to treat agitated and violent patients with neuropsychiatric disorders such as bipolar disorder and schizophrenia.
 Nemonapride binds D3, D4 and D5.
 Olanzapine binds all receptors and is used to treat the positive and negative symptoms of schizophrenia as well as bipolar disorder and depression. It has been associated with significant weight gain.

 Quetiapine binds D1, D2 and D3 and can bind D4 at high concentrations. It is used to treat the positive symptoms of schizophrenia, bipolar disorder and depression. Of the second generation antipsychotics, quetiapine may produce fewer parkinsonian side effects.
 Paliperidone binds D2, D3 and D4 with high affinity; can also bind D1 and D5.

 Remoxipride binds D2 receptors with relatively low affinity.
 Risperidone binds D2, D3 and D4 receptors. Risperidone not only treats the positive and negative symptoms of schizophrenia but also treats bipolar disorder.

 Tiapride blocks D2 and D3 and is used as an antipsychotic. It is also often used to treat dyskinesias, psychomotor agitations, tics, Huntington's chorea and alcohol dependence.
 Ziprasidone blocks the D2 receptor and is used to treat schizophrenia, depression and bipolar disorder. There is controversy on whether Ziprasidone treats negative symptoms and it has well documented gastrointestinal side effects. Ziprasidone can also cause QTc prolongation.

Dopamine antagonists used to treat nausea and vomiting
 Domperidone is a peripherally selective dopamine D2 receptor antagonist used as an antiemetic, gastroprokinetic agent and galactagogue.
 Bromopride binds enteric D2 receptors and also treats gastroparesis.
 Metoclopramide also treats gastroparesis

Antagonists used only in research settings
 Eticlopride binds D2 and D3 with high affinity but also binds D4
 Nafadotride binds D2 and D3
 Raclopride binds D2 and D3 and can be radiolabeled and used in PET imaging to identify disease progression in Huntington's Disease

References

External links